was a feudal domain under the Tokugawa shogunate of Edo period Japan, located in Hitachi Province (modern-day Ibaraki Prefecture), Japan. It was centered on Shimotsuma Jin'ya in what is now the city of Shimotsuma, Ibaraki.  It was ruled for much of its history by a junior branch of the Inoue clan; however, it suffered from frequent changes of rules due to the tendency of the Inoue daimyō to die at young ages.

History
During the Sengoku period, the area around Shimotsuma was controlled by the Tagaya clan, retainers of the Yūki clan. Although the Tagaya clan pledged allegiance to Tokugawa Ieyasu following the Battle of Odawara in 1590, their support of the Tokugawa was less than lukewarm, and during the Battle of Sekigahara, the clan defected to the Uesugi clan, and were therefore stripped of their 60,000 koku holdings.

The domain was then awarded to the 11th son of Tokugawa Ieyasu, Tokugawa Yorifusa, who later went on to become founder of the Mito Domain. He was replaced at Shimotsuma by Matsudaira Tadamasa, the son of Yūki Hideyasu, followed by Matsudaira Sadatsuna. After his transfer to Kakegawa Domain in 1619, the domain became tenryō territory controlled directly by the shogunate until 1712.

In 1712, Inoue Tadanaga, a confidant and retainer of Tokugawa Ienobu from the time before he became Shōgun, had risen through the government hierarchy and through merit and inheritance, has achieved the 10,000 koku necessary for daimyō status. Shimotsuma Domain was revived to become his fiefdom, and remained in the hands of the Inoue clan until the Meiji restoration. However, ten of the 14 Inoue daimyō were adopted into the clan from other families due to the tendency of the rulers to die young and without heir.

During the Boshin War, the final Inoue daimyō, Inoue Masaoto initially sided with the pro-Tokugawa forces, but then switched sides to the Imperial cause. However, many of his samurai opposed this change, and defected to fight on the side of Aizu Domain during the Battle of Aizu. Because of this, the Meiji government initially declared him to be a traitor and forfeit of his domain, but due to the strong arguments of his karō and the seppuku of leading pro-Tokugawa retainers, the decision was rescinded. He was later elevated to the kazoku peerage with the title of viscount (shishaku) during the Meiji period.

The domain had a population of 2055 people in 329 households per a census in 1855.

Holdings at the end of the Edo period
As with most domains in the han system, Shimotsuma Domain consisted of several discontinuous territories calculated to provide the assigned kokudaka, based on periodic cadastral surveys and projected agricultural yields.

Hitachi Province
23 villages in Makabe District
Shimotsuke Province
12 villages in Tsuga District
Musashi Province
5 villages in Saitama District
2 villages in Ōsato District

List of daimyō

References

External links
 Shimotsuma  on "Edo 300 HTML"
Kikuchi, Akira (2000). Shinsengumi Hyakuichi no Nazo. Tōkyō: Shin Jinbutsu Ōraisha.

Notes

Domains of Japan
1871 disestablishments in Japan
States and territories disestablished in 1871
Hitachi Province
History of Ibaraki Prefecture